Queen Elizabeth Forest Park is a  forest park in the Scottish Highlands which extends from the eastern shores of Loch Lomond to the mountains of Strathyre. The forest park is one of six such parks in Scotland, and was established in 1953, the year of the 
coronation of Elizabeth II. It is owned and managed by Forestry and Land Scotland.

Geography 
The park is part of Loch Lomond and The Trossachs National Park and is a sparsely-populated region of mountains, hills, lochs and valleys. Most of the upland areas are bare and uncultivated, while much of the lowland is densely forested.

Its lakes and reservoirs include Loch Ard, Loch Chon, Loch Venachar, Loch Arklet, Loch Katrine, Loch Achray and Loch Drunkie. Its forests include Achray Forest, Buchanan Forest, Strathyre Forest and Loch Ard Forest.

Tourism 
The main visitor centre for the area is The Lodge Forest Visitor Centre at Aberfoyle on the edge of the highlands on the eastern hillside of Craigmore. There are marked hiking trails and a car trail, the Three Lochs Forest Drive.

Gallery

References

External links
Queen Elizabeth Forest Park - Forestry and Land Scotland

Trossachs
Forest parks of Scotland